The Fremont micropolitan area may refer to:

The Fremont, Nebraska micropolitan area, United States
The Fremont, Ohio micropolitan area, United States

See also
Fremont (disambiguation)